Abcoude is a railway station located in Abcoude, Netherlands.

History
The station is located on the Amsterdam–Arnhem railway between Amsterdam and Utrecht, and was opened on 18 December 1843. Previously, there were only two trains a day going to Abcoude. The line was doubled to 4 tracks in 2007 and the old station closed with a new station opening a few hundred metres to the north. The old station stood next to the Gein with the line crossing the river by a bridge which was barely higher than the river level. During the quadrupling of the line a new underpass was built to take the railway under the river. This new underpass begins just after the current station and emerges back at ground level a good distance past the original station buildings.

Accidents and incidents

On 12 March 2015, a passenger train caught fire at the station and was evacuated. Twenty-one passengers had breathed in smoke but could resume their journey, one passenger excluding the train driver was taken to the hospital.

Train services
The following services currently call at Abcoude:
2x per hour local service (sprinter) Uitgeest – Amsterdam – Woerden – Rotterdam
2x per hour local service (sprinter) Uitgeest – Amsterdam – Utrecht – Rhenen (Not in the evening and the weekend)

References

External links
NS website 
Dutch Public Transport journey planner 

Railway stations in Utrecht (province)
Railway stations on the Rhijnspoorweg
1843 establishments in the Netherlands
De Ronde Venen
Railway stations in the Netherlands opened in 1843